Elvis Chipezeze (born 11 March 1990) is a Zimbabwean football player. He plays in South Africa for Magesi.

Career

Club
On 27 March 2018, Chipezeze joined South African club Baroka F.C. on a pre-contract deal. He made his league debut for the club on 29 August 2018, playing the entirety of a 1-1 draw with Highlands Park F.C.

International
He made his Zimbabwe national football team debut on 5 June 2019 in a 2019 COSAFA Cup game against Zambia. He was then selected for the 2019 Africa Cup of Nations squad. He performed dismally in the last groups stages make it or break it game between Zimbabwe and Democratic Republic of Congo where Zimbabwe lost by 4 goals to nil.

Honors

Club
Baroka
Telkom Knockout: 2018

References

External links
 
 

1990 births
Living people
Zimbabwean footballers
Zimbabwe international footballers
Association football goalkeepers
Chicken Inn F.C. players
Baroka F.C. players
Magesi F.C. players
South African Premier Division players
National First Division players
2019 Africa Cup of Nations players
Zimbabwean expatriate footballers
Expatriate soccer players in South Africa
Zimbabwe A' international footballers
2016 African Nations Championship players